Mallosia galinae is a species of beetle in the family Cerambycidae. It was described by Mikhail Leontievich Danilevsky in 1990. It was first discovered in Azerbaijan and is now also known from Georgia.

Mallosia galinae measure  in length. Its host plants are Ferula and Prangos ferulacea (family Apiaceae).

References

Saperdini
Beetles of Asia
Beetles described in 1990